Hakea ambigua is a shrub in the family Proteaceae. In favourable conditions may grow into an attractive weeping shrub with creamy white flowers. Only found in the Stirling Ranges of southern Western Australia.

Description
Smaller branches hairy. Leaves are wider in the middle with three longitudinal veins on both sides ending in a blunt point.
The sweetly scented creamy white  or yellow flowers, occasionally with a pink tinge, appear in the leaf axils from August to October.
Hakea ambigua may be used for erosion control, hedging and wildlife habitat.

Taxonomy
Hakea ambigua was first formally described by botanist Carl Meissner in 1848 who published the description in  Johann Georg Christian Lehmann's book Plantae Preissianae. The type specimen was collected by James Drummond near the Swan River. The specific epithet (ambigua) is derived from the Latin word ambiguus meaning "of double meaning", "doubtful" or "uncertain" considered to be a reference by Meisner having doubts "about the species relationships".

Distribution and habitat
Hakea ambigua is found in areas along the south coast in the Great Southern and South West regions of Western Australia. The bulk of the population is confined to the Stirling Range. It is found on hillslopes, growing mostly in shrubland and mallee in sandy rocky quartzitic soil and gravelly loam.  It requires a sunny aspect on a well-drained site.

References

ambigua
Eudicots of Western Australia
Plants described in 1848